Hatun Rit'i (Quechua hatun big, rit'i snow, "big snow (mountain)", Hispanicized spelling Jatunrite) is a mountain in the Andes of Peru, about  high. It lies in the Huancavelica Region, Angaraes Province, Lircay District.

References

Mountains of Huancavelica Region
Mountains of Peru